Adriaen van Gaesbeeck (22 August 1621 – 11 February 1650) was a Dutch painter of genre subjects and portraits. His works, which are rare, are in the manner of Gerard Dou and Pieter van Slingeland. The Berlin Gallery possesses The Seamstress, and the Amsterdam Museum a portrait of a young man.

References

 Adriaen van Gaesbeeck in the RKD

Attribution:
 

1621 births
1650 deaths
Dutch genre painters
Artists from Leiden
Dutch Golden Age painters
Dutch male painters